The 21 megawatt Blythe Photovoltaic Power Plant is a photovoltaic (PV) solar project in California. Commercial operation began in December 2009. Electricity generated by the power plant is being sold to Southern California Edison under a 20-year power purchase agreement. Another 20 MW plant called NRG Solar Blythe II came online in April 2017.

Production

See also

Blythe Solar Power Project
List of concentrating solar thermal power companies
List of photovoltaic power stations
List of solar thermal power stations
Renewable energy in the United States
Renewable portfolio standard
Solar power in the United States

References

Solar power in the Mojave Desert
Photovoltaic power stations in the United States
Solar power stations in California
Blythe, California
Colorado Desert
Buildings and structures in Riverside County, California
Energy infrastructure completed in 2009
2009 establishments in California
Southern California Edison
NRG Energy